Gavin Reddy (born 19 August 1996) is a South African cricketer. He made his List A debut for KwaZulu-Natal in the 2016–17 CSA Provincial One-Day Challenge on 18 December 2016.

References

External links
 

1996 births
Living people
South African cricketers
KwaZulu-Natal cricketers
Place of birth missing (living people)